School of Young Geographers is an extracurricular educational body that prepares primary and secondary school students in geography, geology, environmental science and other related disciplines.

The school was founded on 23 February 1975 by a group of students of the Faculty of Geography of the University of Latvia led by Egils Birznieks. It has been operating uninterrupted ever since, being one of the oldest extant organisations of extracurricular education in Latvia.

It is located primarily in Riga, Latvia with its subsidiaries in Valmiera, Liepāja and Rēzekne. For certain periods its sister schools have been operated in other cities of Latvia: Grobiņa, Jelgava, Ogre, Salaspils, Kuldīga and Druva.

Up to 500 school students participate in the monthly events organised by the School in 4 regions of Latvia. in its non-formal education events: quizzes, presentations, research conferences, wilderness expeditions, fieldworks and outdoor games. The School also organises annual national geography olympiads in Latvia and international olympiads in the Baltic Sea region.

Presidents of the school 
Presidents of the central school
 Anita Vanaga - 1976-1977
 Tālis Jaunzemis - 1977-1979
 Anita Tišlere - 1979-1982
 Juris Paiders - 1982-1986
 Ilmārs Mežs - 1986-1989
 Aivars Beldavs - 1989-1992
 Gatis Pāvils - 1992-1996
 Mārtiņš Vimba - 1996-1998
 Uldis Klepers - since 1998

Presidents of the Vidzeme School of Young Geographers
 Uldis Klepers - 1998-2000
 Andris Vinters - 2000-2007
 Gatis Kampernovs - since 2007

Presidents of Latgale School of Young Geographers
 Gatis Kampernovs - 2011-2015
 Edmunds Gutāns - since 2015

Recognition 
In 1978 the Geographic Society of the Soviet Union awarded the School with its honorary medal for contribution in extracurricular education of the Soviet Union.
Both its founder Egils Birznieks and its longest running president Uldis Klepers have been awarded Kronvald's prize by the president of Latvia for their lifetime contribution to the education of Latvia.

References

External links 
 

Schools in Latvia
Education in Riga